The Citronelle Formation is a Hemphillian geologic formation in Georgia, Alabama, Florida, Mississippi and Louisiana.

Fossil content 
It preserves fossils of:

 Nannippus cf. lenticularis
 Neohipparion eurystyle
 Pomatodelphis inaequalis
 Synthetoceras cf. tricornatus
 Anomia taylorensis
 Cassidulus gouldii
 Chlamys chickaria
 Chlamys gainstownensis
 Chlamys glendonensis
 Chlamys mcquirti
 Kuphus incrassatus
 Pecten howei
 Caretta sp.
 Teleoceras sp.
 Trionyx sp.
 Camelidae indet.
 Cervidae indet.
 Scombroidei indet.

See also 

 List of fossiliferous stratigraphic units in Alabama
 List of fossiliferous stratigraphic units in Louisiana
 Paleontology in Alabama
 Paleontology in Louisiana
 Alachua Formation
 Chagres Formation
 Goliad Formation
 Rattlesnake Formation

References

Further reading 
 E. M. Manning and B. J. MacFadden. 1989. Pliocene three-toed horses from Louisiana, with comments on the Citronelle Formation. Tulane Studies in Geology and Paleontology 22(2):35-46
 W. C. Isphording and G. M. Lamb. 1971. Age and origin of the Citronelle Formation in Alabama. Geological Society America Bulletin 82:775-780
 L. N. Glawe. 1966. Geologic section exposed in Lone Star Cement Company quarry at St. Stephens Bluff on Tombigbee River, 2 2 miles northeast of the present town of St Stephens, Ala. Facies Changes in the Alabama Tertiary 95-98

Geologic formations of the United States
Pliocene Series of North America
Neogene Alabama
Neogene Florida
Neogene Louisiana
Neogene Mississippi
Neogene Georgia (U.S. state)
Hemphillian
Sandstone formations of the United States
Shale formations of the United States
Marl formations
Limestone formations
Lagoonal deposits
Shallow marine deposits
Paleontology in Alabama
Paleontology in Louisiana